Andro is a given name and a surname. The alternate Scottish spelling is Androw. Notable people with the name include:

Given name
Andro Bušlje (born 1986), Croatian water polo player 
Andro Enukidze (born 1965), Georgian theater director
Andro Franca (born 1987), Dutch footballer
Andro Giorgadze (born 1996), Georgian footballer
Andro Hart (died 1621), Scottish printer
Andro Knego (born 1956), Croatian former professional basketball player
Andro Knel (1967–1989), Dutch footballer
Andro Krstulović Opara (born 1967), Croatian politician and art historian
Andro Linklater (1944–2013), Scottish non-fiction writer and historian
Andro Man (died 1598), Scottish cunning man
Andro Michel (born 1990), Swedish ice hockey player
Androw Myllar (fl. 1503–1508), Scottish printer
Andro Švrljuga (born 1985), Croatian footballer
Andro Vlahušić (born 1960), Croatian physician and politician
Andro Wekua (born 1977), Georgian-born Swiss artist

Surname
Jean-Claude Andro (1937–2000), French writer

See also
Andro (disambiguation)
 Andrija

Croatian masculine given names
Scottish masculine given names
Georgian masculine given names